The Laws of Florida are the session laws of the Florida Legislature, a verbatim publication of the general and special laws enacted by the Florida Legislature in a given year and published each year following the regular session of the legislature. It presents the laws in the order in which they are numbered by the Secretary of State, as well as resolutions and memorials passed by the Legislature.

See also 
 Florida Statutes
 Law of Florida
 United States Statutes at Large

References

External links 
 Laws of Florida 1845-1996  
 Laws of Florida 1997-present 

Florida law